Mit Okba or Mit Akaba is a former village, that was incorporated in the 1950s as two shiakhas (census  blocks) in the Agouza district of Giza, Egypt, as the real estate development of Madinat al-Awqaf was built on its fileds. Many of the original houses, and much of the narrow street fabric remains today.

History 
It was found by Uqba bin Amir al-Guhni in 665. The ancient Coptic Theotokos church (which also could be a monastery) used to be in Mit Okba which Copts called tiMone enAkope.

References

External links 
Paving the Streets of Meet Okba
 Mīt `Uqba Market 

Populated places in Giza Governorate